Abbas Khadir (3 March 1973; German: Abbas Khider; Arabic:عباس خضر) is a German author and poet of Iraqi origin. He was imprisoned for his political activism against the regime of Saddam Hussein, and took refuge in a number of countries before he was granted asylum in Germany, namely Berlin, in 2000, where he continues to live. He is mostly known for his four novels, "The Village Indian,” “The President's Oranges,” “Letter to the Aubergine Republic” and “A Slap in the Face,” to which he received several literary prizes and scholarships, including, most recently, the Adelbert von Chamisso Prize.

Personal life 
Khadir was born in Baghdad in 1973, and is brother to eight siblings. He was born to illiterate parents who sold dates for a living.

By the age of 14, Khadir started reading religious books, which was the only genre his house homed. He discovered his love for literature through these religious texts, seeing that it is often figurative in nature. This helped facilitate his reading and understanding of poetry. He found refuge in reading, and it opened doors to rediscovering the world. Through his readings, he travelled to Germany with Franz Kafka, to Russia with Alexander Pushkin, and to France with Charles Baudelaire. Despite being educated, none of Khadir's siblings grew an interest in literature, except for his sisters and the literary critic, Saleh Zamel, who was also a spouse to one of his sisters. Khadir spent most of his time reading in Zamel's library, and it is through which Khadir discovered many new writers with whom he, later, met personally. It is his love for reading and the inspiration by the works of different authors that generated his desire to write.

Education 
During his stay in Germany, Khadir gained the necessary qualifications in order to get admitted to university. In five years’ time, he successfully completed studying in three different educational institutions: an Arabic school, an online school, and a college-preparatory school. He then enrolled in University of Munich and University of Potsdam, where he studied literature and philosophy, respectively.

Career 
Before arriving at Germany, Khadir made his living off temporary jobs. Upon being granted asylum in Germany, he started his writing profession. In addition to the monetary and institutional support, Khadir was awarded literary prizes and scholarships, which expanded his audience.

In 2014, and in cooperation with a number of writers, Khadir organized “Cairo Short Stories” writers’ workshop for outstanding young writers at the Goethe-Institut Ägypten. Out of the 108 participants who submitted their short stories, eleven candidates were shortlisted, and three won. The goal of the workshop was to assist the candidates in their development process as writers by giving them tips and pieces of advice. In return, Khadir and the other writers will get to learn about the candidates’ experience as writers influenced by the German and Arab cultures.

In 2017, which was the same year he was nominated for the Mainzer Stadtschreiber literary award, Khadir completed two additional manuscripts, one of which was a humorous exploration of the German language, and the other a novel.

Khadir is currently hosting a number of reading projects in European and non-European countries. He, too, wishes to have his German novels translated, and to work on publishing more books.

His arrest 
During his high school years, Khadir got involved with unauthorized personnels, and engaged in political activities that opposed the regime of Saddam Hussein, who was the dictator of Iraq at the time. He sold books that were banned by the government, to which he attached leaflets containing his own writings. Consequently, he was arrested and sentenced to two years’ imprisonment, namely from the year 1993 to 1995. In 1996, he fled to Jordan, and later moved to a number of Mediterranean countries, including Egypt, Libya, Tunisia, Turkey, Greece and Italy, in which he resided as an undocumented refugee and lived off temporary job posts. In 2000, he was arrested upon his arrival to Germany by a Bavarian border police officer, and, as per the German asylum law in effect at the time, was prohibited from leaving the country.

His writings 
Most of Khadir's writings were based on personal experiences and the experiences of those whom he encountered in life. He gave refugees in Germany a literary voice, and the account of a refugee life in his novels were more than just a naturalistic depiction. His novels explored the gendered nature of power systems, the Kafkaesque dynamics of bureaucracy and the Gambian notion of the refugee as the ultimate biopolitical subject. Khadir's originality was reflected in his form and content, and he manifested concepts, such as self-protection and resistance, in a humorous tone. This drove German critics to describe Khadir as a writer who committed to narrating stories about outcasts.

For instance, in his second novel, The President's Oranges, Khadir describes prisons in Iraq during Saddam Hussein's rule. As for his third novel, Letter to the Aubergine Republic, he narrates the journey of a love letter sent by an exiled Salim in Libya to his beloved Samia in Iraq. Khadir cleverly used the Aubergine Republic to refer to Iraq at a time the eggplant was the most prevalent food item in the country.

Works

Novels 

 "The Village Indian” (original title in German: Der falsche Inder), Edition Nautilus, Hamburg, 2008.
 "The President's Oranges” (original title in German: Die Orangen des Präsidenten), Edition Nautilus, Hamburg, 2011.
 "Letter to the Aubergine Republic" (original title in German: Brief in die Auberginenrepublik), Edition Nautilus, Hamburg 2013.
 “A Slap in the Face” (original title in German: Ohrfeige), Carl Hanser Verkag, 2016.
 “Palace of the Miserables” (original title in German: Palast der Miserablen), Carl Hanser Verlag, Munich, 2020. Before his eight and final version, Khadir had to take a break midway and distance himself from writing this book, so that he is able to view it from a different perspective. It was during his break that he decided to work on something different, and started writing “German for everyone” handbook. In contrast to his novel, Khadir laid out the handbook in a very simple form of the German language. This gave room to have Khadir use a more complicated German when narrating his novel, whose setting, this time, is in Iraq, rather than Germany.
 "The memory-faker" (original title in German: Der Erinnerungsfälscher)

Non-fiction 

 “German for everyone" (original title in German: Deutsch für alle), Carl Hanser Verlag, Munich, 2020. As a result of the public's constant demand for it, Khadir compiled numerous stories and lessons on how to develop a cosmopolitan outlook and humor into a book. Khadir went from knowing only three German words (Hitler, Scheiße and Lufthansa) to reading German philosophers, like Kant, Hegel and Hölderlin. In his satire, he answers curious questions about the grammatical rules of the German language, such as the reason adjectives are changed to match the noun, and the reason behind the multiplicity of German prepositions. He takes this handbook to be the first step to changing the world, and, by using a satirical tone, brings forth a new style of the German language to expats, migrants and Germans themselves.

Awards

Prizes 

 Adelbert von Chamisso Prize, promotional prizes, 2010
 Hilde Domin Prize, 2013 
 Nelly Sachs Prize, 2013
 Spycher Prize, 2016
 Mainzer Stadtschreiber, 2017
 Adelbert von Chamisso Prize, 2017

Scholarships 

 Alfred Döblin Scholarship, 2009
 German Literature Fund working grant, 2010
 Robert Bosch Foundation working grant, 2011
 Villa Aurora scholarship, 2011
 Edenkoben Künstlerhaus Scholarship, 2013
 Cross-border commuter scholarship, 2013
 London Scholarship, 2013
 Berlin Senate Scholarship, 2015
 Comburg Literature Scholarship, 2019
 German Literature Fund working grant, 2019

Lectureships 

 He was granted poetics lectureship at the University of Koblenz and Landau, 2013.
 He attended as a guest lecturer at Heinrich Heine University Düsseldorf, 2016.

References 

Living people
1973 births
German people of Iraqi descent
Iraqi male writers
21st-century Iraqi novelists
German male novelists
21st-century Iraqi poets
20th-century Iraqi poets
Iraqi philosophers
Ludwig Maximilian University of Munich alumni
University of Potsdam alumni